USS PC-457 was a submarine chaser of the United States Navy before World War II.

PC-457 was built in 1939 as the yacht Trouper by Robert Jacob and Sons shipyard of City Island, New York for C. A. Tilt of Chicago, IL, the president of the Diamond T Motor Company.

She was acquired by the US Navy in 1940 due to the Navy's rapidly rising demand for patrol craft as the war in Europe expanded.  She was commissioned in 1941.

On 14 August 1941 she was sunk in a collision near San Juan, Puerto Rico with freighter  .

References 
         
 

Submarine chasers of the United States Navy
Ships sunk in collisions
1939 ships
Maritime incidents in August 1941